William Caulfeild, 1st Viscount Charlemont PC (Ire) (1624 – April 1671) was an Irish politician and peer.

Background
Born in Donamon Castle in County Roscommon, he was the third son of William Caulfeild, 2nd Baron Caulfeild and his wife Mary King, daughter of Sir John King and Catherine Drury. His two older brothers Toby Caulfeild, 3rd Baron Caulfeild and Robert Caulfeild, 4th Baron Caulfeild died both without male issue and he succeeded to the barony on the latter's death in 1644.

Career
Having been first a leading Parliamentarian under Oliver Cromwell, he captured Sir Phelim O'Neil in 1653 and executed him for rebellion and the murder of his brother Toby and his family. In 1660, Caulfeild switched his allegiance and supported afterwards King Charles II of England, captaining a troop of horse. After the English Restoration, he took his seat in the Irish House of Lords and was sworn of the Privy Council of Ireland.

In 1661, Caulfeild was appointed Custos Rotulorum of County Armagh and Custos Rotulorum of Tyrone, holding both offices until his death in 1671. He was rewarded the governorship of Fort Charlemont for life in July of the same year, however sold this office to The Crown three years later. On 8 October 1665, he was created Viscount Charlemont, in the County of Armagh.

Family
In 1653, he married Hon. Sarah Moore, second daughter of Charles Moore, 2nd Viscount Moore of Drogheda and Alice Loftus and had by her four sons and three daughters. She was the sister-of-law to Caulfeild's younger brother Thomas. Caulfeild died in April 1671 and was buried at St Patrick's Cathedral, Armagh on 25 May. His wife survived him until 1712. He was succeeded in his titles by his second and oldest surviving son William. A younger son Toby produced several notable descendants, including his grandson John, Archdeacon of Kilmore and John's son, General James Caulfeild. His daughter Mary was the second wife of William Blayney, 6th Baron Blayney and his daughter Alice married firstly John, son of James Margetson and secondly George Carpenter, 1st Baron Carpenter. Caulfeild's youngest son John sat in the Parliament of Ireland.

Memorial
There is a memorial on the west wall of the north transept of St Patrick's Cathedral, Armagh.

References

1624 births
1671 deaths
17th-century Irish people
William
People from County Roscommon
People from County Armagh
Irish soldiers
Cavaliers
Roundheads
Members of the Privy Council of Ireland
Viscounts Charlemont
Younger sons of barons